Berdon syndrome, also called Megacystis-microcolon-intestinal hypoperistalsis syndrome (MMIH syndrome), is an autosomal recessive fatal genetic disorder affecting newborns. In a 2011 study of 227 children with the syndrome, "the oldest survivor [was] 24 years old." The Ann Arbor News reported a five year old survivor at the end of 2015.

It is more prevalent in females (7 females to 3 males) and is characterized by constipation and urinary retention, microcolon, giant bladder (megacystis), intestinal hypoperistalsis, hydronephrosis and dilated small bowel. The pathological findings consist of an abundance of ganglion cells in both dilated and narrow areas of the intestine. It is a familial disturbance of unknown cause.

Walter Berdon et al. in 1976 first described the condition in five female infants, two of whom were sisters. All had marked dilatation of the bladder and some had hydronephrosis and the external appearance of prune belly. The infants also had microcolon and dilated small intestines.

Genetics
Berdon syndrome is autosomal recessive, which means the defective gene is located on an autosome, and two copies of the gene – one inherited from each parent – are required to be born with the disorder. The parents of an individual with an autosomal recessive disorder both carry one copy of the defective gene but are usually not affected by the disorder.

Several genes are known to be implicated in this syndrome: these include ACTG2, LMOD1, MYH11 and MYLK.

Diagnosis
Berdon syndrome is generally diagnosed after birth by the signs and symptoms as well as radiological and surgical findings. It can be diagnosed in the womb by ultrasound, revealing the enlarged bladder and hydronephrosis.

Treatment
Long-term survival with Berdon syndrome usually requires parenteral nutrition and urinary catheterisation or diversion. Most long-term survivors also have ileostomies. A multivisceral transplant (stomach, pancreas, small bowel, liver and  large intestine) has also been successful.

References

External links 
 
 

Autosomal recessive disorders
Syndromes affecting the gastrointestinal tract
Genetic disorders with OMIM but no gene
Syndromes affecting the kidneys